The Quebrada Chocolate Formation is a geologic formation in Costa Rica. It preserves fossils dating back to the Neogene period.

See also

 List of fossiliferous stratigraphic units in Costa Rica

References

External links 
 

Geologic formations of Costa Rica
Neogene Costa Rica